Antonio Angulo Sampedro (born 18 August 1992) is a Spanish cyclist, who currently rides for UCI ProTeam .

Major results

2015
 1st Overall 
 1st 
 5th Korona Kocich Gór
2016
 1st Overall 
 1st Clàssica Xavier Tondo
 1st 
 1st Stages 3 & 4 Vuelta Ciclista a León
 1st Stage 3 Vuelta a Cantabria
 1st Stage 2 Volta a Lleida
 2nd 
 3rd Overall 
2018
 1st Stage 2 Tour of Galicia
 1st Stage 1 
 1st Stage 2 
 2nd Overall Vuelta a Cantabria
1st Prologue
2019
 2nd Overall 
1st Stage 3
 6th Road race, National Road Championships
2020
 10th Overall Tour du Limousin
2021
 8th Overall Tour du Limousin
2022
 5th Overall Tour de Bretagne

References

External links

1992 births
Living people
Spanish male cyclists
Cyclists from Cantabria
People from the Western Coast of Cantabria